KFAS-LP (95.7 FM) was a radio station licensed to Shelby, Montana, United States. The station was owned by Shelby Educational Association.

On October 5, 2017, the Federal Communications Commission informed KFAS-LP that, as the station had been silent since January 10, 2016, it was in the process of cancelling the station's license; the license was canceled on November 6, 2017.

References

External links
 

FAS-LP
FAS-LP
Radio stations established in 2007
2007 establishments in Montana
Radio stations disestablished in 2017
2017 disestablishments in Montana
Defunct radio stations in the United States
FAS-LP